Parchi Kola (also Romanized as Parchī Kolā; also known as Parchī Kūlā) is a village in Kolijan Rostaq-e Sofla Rural District, in the Central District of Sari County, Mazandaran Province, Iran. At the 2006 census, its population was 367, in 81 families.

References 

Populated places in Sari County